John Henry Challis (6 August 1806 – 28 February 1880) was an Anglo-Australian merchant, landowner and philanthropist, whose bequest to the University of Sydney allowed for the establishment of the Challis Professorships.

Early life and migration
Challis was born in England, the son of John Henry Challis, sergeant in the 9th Regiment, and his first wife. He was educated at several schools and trained as a clerk. He then migrated to Sydney, New South Wales, arriving on the Pyramis on 9 May 1829 as a steerage passenger. He was employed by Marsden and Flower, merchants. In 1842 the firm was reorganized under the name of Flower, Salting and Company, when Challis was admitted as a junior partner. The business dealt in wool, whale oil other commodities and became very prosperous. He acquired several properties, including a large holding at Potts Point, pastoral licenses of over 12,000 sq. miles (31,080 km²) in southern New South Wales, more than 3,500 cattle and 11,000 sheep. In 1855 he sold his business interests and returned to England. Returning to Europe, Challis spent much of his time travelling.

Sydney University bequest
In 1856 Challis subscribed for stained glass windows in the Great Hall of the University of Sydney; in 1859 he re-visited Sydney and gave  for the 'Royal Window'.

Challis died in France on 28 February 1880 and was buried at Folkestone, England. Under his will the whole of his residuary estate was left to the University of Sydney, subject to a tenure until death or remarriage of his widow Henrietta, and a provision that the estate should accumulate for five years after such death or remarriage. Henrietta died on 19 September 1884 and because Challis had been residing in England, the English Inland Revenue Commission claimed legacy duties. The University of Sydney's chancellor, Sir William Montagu Manning, strenuously argued against the Commission's claims which were subsequently abandoned.

The income from the fund has provided for seven professorships (in anatomy, zoology, engineering, history, law, modern literature, and logic and mental philosophy) and several lectureships. The bequest, however, meant more than that.

The University also developed a property in Martin Place, subsequently named Challis House. Completed in 1907 and remodelled in the Art Deco style in 1936 and again refurbished in 1973, the commercial premises provides income to sustain Challis' legacy. A portrait of Challis is in the Great Hall of the University, and there is also a marble statue of him by Achille Simonetti.

References

Bibliography

David S. Macmillan, 'Challis, John Henry (1806 - 1880)', Australian Dictionary of Biography, Volume 3, MUP, 1969, pp 374–375.

English philanthropists
Australian philanthropists
Australian people of English descent
1806 births
1880 deaths
Australian people in whaling
Australian ship owners
19th-century British philanthropists
19th-century English businesspeople
19th-century Australian businesspeople